Marius Popescu is a Romanian former football player, currently manager. He played almost his entire career for  Universitatea Cluj and managed teams like Botoşani and Universitatea Cluj. The last team managed was ASA Târgu Mureș.

Honours

Player
Universitatea Cluj
Divizia B: 1991–92, 2006–07
Divizia C: 2000–01

References

External links
 
 

Living people
1969 births
Sportspeople from Alba Iulia
Romanian footballers
Association football midfielders
FC Universitatea Cluj players
CFR Cluj players
ACF Gloria Bistrița players
FC Olimpia Satu Mare players
CSM Unirea Alba Iulia players
FC UTA Arad players
Liga I players
Liga II players
Liga III players
Romanian football managers
FC Botoșani managers
FC Universitatea Cluj managers
ASA 2013 Târgu Mureș managers